Henry Judd Baker (died August 28, 2016) was an American actor known for such films and television shows as Oliver Stone's Seizure, Clean and Sober, The Mighty Quinn, William Friedkin's Cruising and Dark Shadows.

Filmography

References

External links

Living people
African-American male actors
American male film actors
American male television actors
Place of birth missing (living people)
Year of birth missing (living people)
20th-century American male actors
20th-century African-American people
21st-century African-American people